Indian Hollow is an unincorporated community along Hogue Creek in Frederick County, Virginia. It is named for the Indian Hollow through Hunting Ridge. The community is located on Indian Hollow Road (VA 679) northeast of Hayfield.

References

Unincorporated communities in Frederick County, Virginia
Unincorporated communities in Virginia